Bid (also Romanized as Bīd) is a village in Pirakuh Rural District, in the Central District of Jowayin County, Razavi Khorasan Province, Iran. At the 2006 census, its population was 286, in 129 families.

References 

Populated places in Joveyn County